Wonder, also called WWW: Wonder, is a 2011 novel written by Canadian novelist Robert J. Sawyer. It is the third and last installment in the WWW Trilogy and was preceded by two sequels, Wake (2009) and Watch (2010).

Synopsis
Ever since the government has tried and failed to eliminate Webmind, Caitlin and her family have been thrust into the media spotlight. People are excited over what Webmind can offer the world, such as the cure for cancer and facilitating international relations, but others are also frightened about its potential for harm. The Pentagon still seeks to eliminate Webmind and has recruited some of the world's best hackers to destroy it forever.

Reception
Critical reception for Wonder was positive, and much of the novel's praise centered upon its "thoughtful "what if" scenarios". In contrast, the National Post expressed disappointment in the final book of the trilogy as they felt that the main flaws were "Sawyer's Pollyanna faith in the benefits of technology" and the insertion of several viewpoints in the book that they stated had an "eerie resemblance to the rankest propaganda".

References

External links

Official author website

2011 science fiction novels
2011 Canadian novels
Novels by Robert J. Sawyer
Novels about the Internet
Novels about artificial intelligence
Novels set in Ontario
Ace Books books